The Avery County Courthouse is a historic courthouse building located at Newland, Avery County, North Carolina.  It was designed by Wheeler & Runge and was built in 1900.  It has included both a courthouse and a correctional facility.

It was listed on the National Register of Historic Places in 1979.

References

 Courthouses on the National Register of Historic Places in North Carolina
 Beaux-Arts architecture in North Carolina
 Government buildings completed in 1900
 Buildings and structures in Avery County, North Carolina
 National Register of Historic Places in Avery County, North Carolina